Jeroen Willem Boere (18 November 1967 – 16 August 2007) was a Dutch professional footballer who played as a striker. He was the younger brother of Remco Boere, who played for clubs including Den Haag and Zwolle. He started his professional career at SBV Excelsior and went on to play for several teams, mostly at Holland's second level.

England
A tall striker, Jeroen Boere went abroad in summer 1993 when he was signed by Billy Bonds for £250,000 to play for newly promoted West Ham United in the Premier League. Jeroen, or 'Yosser' as he was known to his teammates, made his debut for West Ham on 25 September 1993 in a 2–0 defeat to Newcastle United but was sent off for a clash with Kevin Scott. Although he struggled to gain a regular place in the West Ham first team, he memorably scored twice for them in a Premier League game at Elland Road on 10 December 1994 to secure a 2–2 draw against Leeds United.

His stay with West Ham lasted two seasons and he was loaned out to Portsmouth and West Bromwich Albion. He was recalled back to West Ham because of their striker shortage when they were near the foot of the table; he formed a partnership with Tony Cottee which helped West Ham to avoid relegation that season. He eventually moved to Crystal Palace in 1995 as part of the deal that took Iain Dowie back to the Boleyn Ground. His spell at Palace was short-lived, however, and he moved on to Southend United at the end of the season.

Japan
Boere moved to Japan in 1998 to play for the newly formed professional club Omiya Ardija, formerly known as NTT Kantō, in the Japan Football League. He played 15 matches and scored 9 goals in his first season in Japan. In the 1999 season, Omiya joined the newly formed J2 League and he started the season very well, scoring 9 in 11 games. In May 1999, after dinner with his wife at a restaurant in Roppongi district of Tokyo, he was stabbed in his left eye and arm by two unknown men who reportedly appeared to be of Middle Eastern origin. His attacker was later reported to be an Israeli criminal who was later found shot through the head in a Bangkok river. Boere lost his eye in the incident, which forced his retirement from football at the age of 31.

Retirement
After his retirement, Boere owned the Half Moon pub in Epping High Street from 1999 until 2004.

During an interview in his pub with a Dutch sports magazine in 2001, Boere joked about his artificial eye and said he had no regrets about his career having played, at the peak of his career, for West Ham United. And, as he said, at least he was still alive. After his pub ownership ended, Boere moved to Spain, in September 2004, to work as a real estate agent.

Death
He died on 16 August 2007 at the age of 39. There are conflicting reports about the cause of death and place of death. Some media reported that Boere died in a car crash, possibly on Ibiza, while other media reported that he was found dead in his home in Marbella. English newspaper Ilford Recorder stated that Boere had committed suicide. Boere left his wife and child as well as two sons from a previous marriage.

West Ham United, Southend United and Omiya Ardija players wore black armbands in memory of Boere in their home games in August 2007.

Career statistics

References

External links
Profile at RODA JC SPELERS

 

1967 births
2007 deaths
Footballers from Arnhem
Association football forwards
Dutch footballers
Excelsior Rotterdam players
De Graafschap players
VVV-Venlo players
Roda JC Kerkrade players
Go Ahead Eagles players
West Ham United F.C. players
Portsmouth F.C. players
West Bromwich Albion F.C. players
Crystal Palace F.C. players
Southend United F.C. players
Omiya Ardija players
Dutch expatriate footballers
Expatriate footballers in England
Expatriate footballers in Japan
Eredivisie players
Eerste Divisie players
Premier League players
English Football League players
J2 League players
Japan Football League (1992–1998) players
Dutch expatriate sportspeople in England
Dutch expatriate sportspeople in Japan
Dutch expatriate sportspeople in Spain
Stabbing survivors